Mary Moran may refer to:

Mary Moran (camogie), Irish camogie player and manager
Mary Moran (politician), Irish Labour Party Senator, member of the 24th Seanad
Mary Nimmo Moran (1842–1889), American landscape artist
Mary C. Moran, former mayor of Bridgeport, Connecticut
Mary Ann Moran, professor of marine sciences